Joseph Pomeroy Root (April 3, 1826 – July 20, 1885) was an American doctor, politician, and leader of the Kansas Free Staters.

A descendant of an old New England family, Root was the great-grandson of Revolutionary War General Seth Pomeroy. He graduated from the Berkshire Medical College in Pittsfield and practiced medicine in New Hartford, Connecticut for five years. In 1855 he was elected to the Connecticut House of Representatives, as a Whig.

After his term, he joined an armed party of abolitionist settlers who ended up settling in Waubansee, Kansas. After Root was briefly a prisoner of pro-slavery settlers, he devoted himself to the Free State cause, ultimately becoming the chairman of the free-state executive committee. After negotiating an exchange of prisoners with pro-slavery Governor Wilson Shannon, Root left Kansas to gather funds, arms, and support among Eastern abolitionists.

On returning to Kansas, Root was elected to the territorial senate under the Topeka Constitution, and soon became president of the senate and a member of the Territorial Council. After the ratification of the Wyandotte Constitution in 1861, Root was elected as the first Lieutenant Governor of the new state.

At the outbreak of the Civil War, Root helped raise units and was a member of the state board for examining medical officers for the army. He soon joined himself as a surgeon for the 2nd Regiment Kansas Volunteer Cavalry, rising to become medical director of the Army of the Frontier.

After the Civil War Root returned to medical practice in Kansas until 1869, when he became secretary of the congressional Committee on Public Lands. In 1870 he was appointed ambassador to Chile, serving in that post until 1873. He received honors from the Chilean government for his work during a smallpox epidemic there.

Root returned to Wyandotte and resumed his practice. He retained an interest in politics and issues of the day, writing the book A Catechism of Money (1876), on the issues of gold and silver coinage and serving as a delegate to the 1884 Republican Party national convention.

Root married Frances Eveline Alden (1827–?; survived until at least 1867), a descendant of John Alden of the Mayflower, in 1851; they had 5 sons, of whom 4 survived to adulthood: Ernest, Frank, Joseph P., and John W.

References

 

Lieutenant Governors of Kansas
Ambassadors of the United States to Chile
Bleeding Kansas
Physicians from Massachusetts
Members of the Connecticut House of Representatives
Members of the Kansas Territorial Legislature
19th-century American diplomats
Kansas Republicans
Connecticut Whigs
19th-century American politicians
American abolitionists
1826 births
1885 deaths
Berkshire Medical College alumni